Slettefjellet is a peak 1 nautical mile (1.9 km) north of Gessner Peak at the northeast end of the Muhlig-Hofmann Mountains, Queen Maud Land. Plotted from surveys and air photos by the Norwegian Antarctic Expedition (1956–60) and named Slettefjellet (the smooth peak).

Mountains of Queen Maud Land
Princess Astrid Coast